The 2017 South American Trampoline Championships were held in Paipa, Colombia, September 15–17, 2017. The competition was organized by the Colombian Gymnastics Federation, and approved by the International Gymnastics Federation.

Medalists

References

2017 in gymnastics
Trampoline,2017
International gymnastics competitions hosted by Colombia
2017 in Colombian sport